The Bolovăniș (in its upper course also: Vancea) is a left tributary of the river Tarcău in Romania. It flows into the Tarcău in Schitu Tarcău.

References

Rivers of Romania
Rivers of Neamț County